The Kamrup Express is a daily Express train which connects Howrah (Kolkata) in West Bengal with Dibrugarh, a major town in upper Assam. Originally the train ran between Howrah and Guwahati (which is the district headquarters of Kamrup district, Assam), hence the name. Later it was extended to Dibrugarh Town after the successful conversion of Guwahati–Lumding–Dibrugarh from meter gauge to broad gauge.Now the train has been divided in 2 pairs respectively with two routes.1.15959/60 runs Via GHY-LMG-DBRG.2.15961/62 runs via RNY-RPAN-NLP-DBRG through Bogibeel Bridge Vice-Versa.  The train belongs to Northeast Frontier Railway of Indian Railways and is operated by Tinsukia division of NF Railway.
The train is numbered as 15959/15960.
15961/15962

Schedule
15959 departs Howrah every day at 18:00 hrs. and reaches Dibrugarh on the day following the day after, at 05:55 in the morning, covering a distance of 1532 km in 35 hrs 55 mins with an average moving speed of 43 km/h. The train has an extended halt at Guwahati arriving at 15:35 hrs.

15960 departs Dibrugarh every day at 18:20 hrs. and reaches Howrah at 6:00 hrs. on the day following the day after, covering a distance of 1532 km in 35 hrs and 40 min with an average moving speed of 43 km/h. It has an extended halt at Guwahati and departs at 7:45 in the morning next day for Howrah.

Route & Halts

WEST BENGAL
  (Starts)
 
  
 
 
 
 
 
 
 
 
 
 
 
 
 
 New Jalpaiguri (Siliguri)
 
 
 
 Falakata
 
 
 Kamakhyaguri

BIHAR
 

NAGALAND
 

ASSAM
 
 Sarbhog
 
 
 Tihu
 
 
 
 
 
 
 Lanka
 
 
 Sarupathar
 Barpathar
 
 
 Amguri
 
 Bhojo
 Namrup
 Naharkatiya
 Duliajan
 
  (Ends)

Change in Route

Harmuti

Coach composition

The train has LHB rakes with max speed of 130 kmph. However, it has a MPS of 110 km/h due to section conditions.

The train has both AC and non AC accommodation, and one pantry car

 1 AC II Tier
 3 AC III Tier
 11 Sleeper coaches
 3 General
 1 Pantry car 
 2 Generator car

Locomotive

References

Transport in Dibrugarh
Transport in Guwahati
Named passenger trains of India
Rail transport in Assam
Rail transport in Nagaland
Railway services introduced in 1972
Express trains in India